Leonardo "Leo" Neoren Franco (born 20 May 1977) is an Argentine former professional footballer who played as a goalkeeper, and is a manager.

After starting out at Independiente in 1995, he went on to spend the vast majority of his career in Spain, playing 328 La Liga matches over 14 seasons in representation of Mallorca, Atlético Madrid and Zaragoza.

An Argentine international for two years, Franco appeared for the nation at the 2006 World Cup.

Club career
Born in San Nicolás de los Arroyos, Buenos Aires Province, Franco started his career at Club Atlético Independiente, moving at the age of 20 to Spain with CP Mérida where he did not appear in La Liga, barred by Carlos Navarro Montoya and suffering team relegation. In the following year he joined RCD Mallorca, spending his first season with their reserves and again dropping down a tier, now in Segunda División.

Franco would be however promoted to the Balearic Islands club's first team, going on to establish himself as the starter after replacing compatriot Carlos Roa in the pecking order. In the 2000–01 campaign he appeared in 27 matches as Mallorca finished in a best-ever third position, and helped win the Copa del Rey two years after.

Franco was signed by Atlético Madrid in June 2004, being first choice from the beginning. Until the end of 2007–08 he saved seven penalties, including two against Sevilla FC on 23 March 2006 (0–1 home loss) and two more at Real Betis on 2 December (1–0 win). Precisely during that season, he was challenged by newly signed Christian Abbiati (loaned by A.C. Milan), but regained his starting status in 2008–09, relegating veteran Grégory Coupet to the bench.

On 1 July 2009, aged 32, after not seeing his contract renewed, Franco left the Vicente Calderón Stadium – as Coupet– and signed with Galatasaray S.K. from Turkey. His first Süper Lig appearance took place on 9 August, in a 3–2 away victory over Gaziantepspor.

Franco returned to Spain after only one year, joining Real Zaragoza on a two-year deal. He made his competitive debut on 29 August 2010, in a 0–0 draw at Deportivo de La Coruña.

Franco left Aragon in the summer of 2014, and subsequently moved to San Lorenzo de Almagro. On 24 July 2015, after appearing rarely, he moved to SD Huesca, newly promoted to the Spanish second tier.

On 19 August 2016, Franco announced his retirement at the age of 39 and was immediately named director of external relations at his last club. On 29 May 2018, he replaced the departing Rubi as first-team manager in view of their first-ever season in the top flight, being dismissed on 9 October due to poor results.

International career
With the Argentina under-20 team, Franco won the 1997 FIFA World Youth Championship in Malaysia. On 6 May 2006, two years after making his debut for the senior side, he was selected by coach José Pekerman – also the manager of the under-20s – to the squad for the 2006 FIFA World Cup.

On 30 June 2006, Franco replaced the injured Roberto Abbondanzieri in the quarter-final clash against hosts Germany, failing to save one single penalty shootout attempt.

Career statistics

Club
Sources:

International

Managerial statistics

Honours
Mallorca
Copa del Rey: 2002–03

Argentina
FIFA World Youth Championship: 1997

References

External links

1977 births
Living people
People from San Nicolás de los Arroyos
Argentine footballers
Association football goalkeepers
Argentine Primera División players
Club Atlético Independiente footballers
San Lorenzo de Almagro footballers
La Liga players
Segunda División players
CP Mérida footballers
RCD Mallorca B players
RCD Mallorca players
Atlético Madrid footballers
Real Zaragoza players
SD Huesca footballers
Süper Lig players
Galatasaray S.K. footballers
Argentina under-20 international footballers
Argentina international footballers
2005 FIFA Confederations Cup players
2006 FIFA World Cup players
Argentine expatriate footballers
Expatriate footballers in Spain
Expatriate footballers in Turkey
Argentine expatriate sportspeople in Spain
Argentine expatriate sportspeople in Turkey
Argentine football managers
La Liga managers
SD Huesca managers
Argentine expatriate football managers
Expatriate football managers in Spain
Sportspeople from Buenos Aires Province